San Salvador is a district of the Guairá Department, Paraguay.

It is located in 18 kilometers southwest of Villarrica, the capital of the department, over the old train rails. It's also known as the former Borja station.

The activities of the inhabitants are agricultural and cattle growing.

Patronal Celebrations

Every January 6 the streets are decorated and the people gets ready for the Mass directed by the Bishop of the Villarrica Dioceses. Every year the people celebrate the party honoring its saint patron Child Savior of the World. His image could be found in the church of the same name.

The novena starts December 28, and every neighborhood has in charge the celebration of one day of Mass. During the nine days are made bullfights, followed by a gala party honoring the saint patron.

When the Mass is finished, the image of the saint patron travels in the procession throughout the city.

Area
This district has an area of 14 square kilometers, with a total population of 3,483 inhabitants and a population density of 24.88 inhabitants per square kilometer.

Limits

 North: The city of Villarrica, capital of the department.
 South: The Iturbe district.
 West: The Borja district.
 East: The Ñumí and Iturbe districts.

Hydrography

The following streams flows through the district:
 Remansito.
 Yhacá Guazú.
 Itacuña.

Demography

The main social-demographic indicators in the district says:
 
 Population under 15 years old: 35.2%
 Average kids per woman: 3,1 kids
 Average illiterates: 10.5%

 65.37% of the population dedicates to the primary sector, 7.5% to the secondary sector and 26.3% to the tertiary sector.

 Percentage of the population occupied in agricultural activities: 65.6%
 Percentage of houses with electricity service: 89.4%
 Percentage of houses with water service: 33.8%
 
Population with unsatisfied basic needs in:
 Education: 8.2%
 Sanitary infrastructure: 12.3%
 Housing quality: 39.8%
 Subsistence capacity: 18.2%

Economy 

The inhabitants in this district are involved in the cultivation of wheat, sugar-cane, tobacco, cotton and grapes. Also stock-breeding of cows, sheep, pigs and horses.

Roads and communication

His most important terrestrial communication is the Route 8 "Doctor Blas Garay", that connects it with the city of Villarrica, capital of the Department, and with Asunción and other locations of the department and the country. The other internal roads are terraced making easier the intercommunication between the districts.

Has the telephonic services from Copaco and mobile telephony, besides various communication media and the journals from the capital of the country.

The district have modern buses to travel to the capital of the country and to the other departments. To the internal trips have buses of less capacity.

How to get there 

From Asunción you have to follow the Route 2 "Mariscal José Félix Estigarribia" until the city of Coronel Oviedo. There taking the detour of the Route 8 "Doctor Blas Garay" you get to the city of Mbocayaty, following the same route you get to the city of Villarrica, capital of the department, and 12 kilometers to the south and taking a non-asphalted road traveling 16 kilometers more you'll get to San Salvador.

Population

According to the data provided by the General Office of Statistics, Polls and Census, this is the data of the San Salvador district:

 Population from 0 to 14 years old: 35.2%
 Population from 15 to 64 years old: 56.4%
 Population from 65 years old: 8.4%

Being 75.44% of the population settled on the rural zone.

Qualified colonies

This colonies were qualified by the INDERT.

 Antonio Rojas Silvera Colony, with an area of 2,177 hectares and 89 shares.
 José A. Molas Colony, with an area of 2,000 hectares 91 shares.

Outstanding citizens

In this city was born the former President of Paraguay, Andrés Rodríguez, who deposed Alfredo Stroessner, the dictator that had governed the country for 35 years.

References 
 “Tiempos del mundo”.
 Geografía del Paraguay.
 Che Retá Paraguay.
 Datos del la DGEEC.
 ABC Color.
 Ultima Hora.

Populated places in the Guairá Department